Fokino is the name of several inhabited localities in Russia.

Urban localities
Fokino, Bryansk Oblast, a town in Dyatkovsky District, Bryansk Oblast
Fokino, Primorsky Krai, a closed town in Primorsky Krai

Rural localities
Fokino, Kaluga Oblast, a village in Iznoskovsky District of Kaluga Oblast
Fokino, Kirov Oblast, a village in Rodyginsky Rural Okrug of Sovetsky District of Kirov Oblast
Fokino, Kostroma Oblast, a village in Sudayskoye Settlement of Chukhlomsky District of Kostroma Oblast
Fokino, Krasnoyarsk Krai, a village in Kucherovsky Selsoviet of Nizhneingashsky District of Krasnoyarsk Krai
Fokino, Kursk Oblast, a village in Krupetskoy Selsoviet of Dmitriyevsky District of Kursk Oblast
Fokino, Mari El Republic, a village in Vyatsky Rural Okrug of Sovetsky District of the Mari El Republic
Fokino, Moscow Oblast, a settlement in Belavinskoye Rural Settlement of Orekhovo-Zuyevsky District of Moscow Oblast
Fokino, Koverninsky District, Nizhny Novgorod Oblast, a village in Skorobogatovsky Selsoviet of Koverninsky District of Nizhny Novgorod Oblast
Fokino, Sharangsky District, Nizhny Novgorod Oblast, a village in Pestovsky Selsoviet of Sharangsky District of Nizhny Novgorod Oblast
Fokino, Vorotynsky District, Nizhny Novgorod Oblast, a selo in Fokinsky Selsoviet of Vorotynsky District of Nizhny Novgorod Oblast
Fokino, Smolensk Oblast, a village in Akatovskoye Rural Settlement of Gagarinsky District of Smolensk Oblast
Fokino, Belozersky District, Vologda Oblast, a village in Glushkovsky Selsoviet of Belozersky District of Vologda Oblast
Fokino, Cherepovetsky District, Vologda Oblast, a village in Batransky Selsoviet of Cherepovetsky District of Vologda Oblast
Fokino, Arkhangelsky Selsoviet, Sokolsky District, Vologda Oblast, a village in Arkhangelsky Selsoviet of Sokolsky District of Vologda Oblast
Fokino, Borovetsky Selsoviet, Sokolsky District, Vologda Oblast, a village in Borovetsky Selsoviet of Sokolsky District of Vologda Oblast